C. J. Prentiss is an American politician of the Democratic party who served in the Ohio State Senate from 1999 until 2007. During the 126th Ohio General Assembly, she served as Minority Leader.

Prentiss grew up in Cleveland, Ohio in an activist family. Her father worked with the Future Outlook League, which was critical in mobilizing the Black community and increasing Black employment. He was assaulted trying to integrate an amusement park during the Euclid Beach Park Riot of 1946. C. J. attended the March on Washington in 1963 along with her mother.

She earned a bachelor of arts degree and a master's degree in education from Cleveland State University. She holds a post-graduate certificate in Administration from Kent State University. She attended the advanced management program at Case Western Reserve University's Weatherhead School of Management.

In 1976, Prentiss was one of the only Black women integrally involved in Ohio’s Cuyahoga Women’s Political Caucus, which at the time was primarily composed of white women. Next, Prentiss became a delegate to the Democratic Convention for Jesse Jackson in 1984, and then became co-chair of the Cleveland Rainbow Coalition.

From 1985 to 1990, Prentiss served on the Ohio State Board of Education. Known in Columbus as "the highest ranking African-American education lawmaker in the state of Ohio," Prentiss served eight years in the Ohio State House of Representatives (8th district) before serving eight years in the Ohio State Senate (21st district). While in the Ohio State Senate, Prentiss represented constituents of Bratenahl, Brooklyn Heights, Cleveland Heights, Cuyahoga Heights, East Cleveland, Newburgh Heights and University Heights. She served as minority whip (during the 125th General Assembly), Senate Minority Leader, was the first female president of the Ohio Legislative Black Caucus (OLBC), and was the second African-American woman to serve as the Democratic leader in the Ohio Senate (after Rhine McLIn).

Prentiss was on numerous committees and consistently advocated for those most underserved. She spearheaded significant legislation that helped to decrease the Black-white academic achievement gap, she obtained funding for all-day kindergarten and reduced class sizes, and she worked tirelessly to improve education for students of all races. Under her leadership, the NBCSL published Closing the Achievement Gap: Improving Educational Outcomes for African American Children, which helped to put the achievement gap on the national agenda.

Prentiss was also on the founding board of directors for the nonpartisan economic policy group Policy Matters Ohio.

She was also chosen to be the Special Education Adviser to Ohio Governor Ted Strickland in 2007.

Prentiss appeared on the pilot episode of 30 Days discussing living on minimum wage.

She was a candidate in the special election to replace Stephanie Tubbs-Jones in the 110th Congress but withdrew before the Primary.

References

External links
Profile on the Ohio Ladies' Gallery website

Year of birth missing (living people)
Living people
African-American state legislators in Ohio
African-American women in politics
Ohio state senators
Cleveland State University alumni
Case Western Reserve University alumni
Politicians from Cleveland
Kent State University alumni
Women state legislators in Ohio
Members of the Ohio House of Representatives
21st-century American politicians
21st-century American women politicians
21st-century African-American women
21st-century African-American politicians